The 2005–06 Lithuanian Hockey League season was the 15th season of the Lithuanian Hockey League, the top level of ice hockey in Lithuania. Five teams participated in the league, and SC Energija won the championship. The league season was abbreviated, and SC Energija met Poseidonas Elektrenai in the final.

Regular season

Final
 SC Energija - Poseidonas Elektrenai 3:0 (6:1, 5:2, 7:4)

External links
Season on hockeyarchives.info

Lithuanian Hockey League
Lithuania Hockey League seasons
Lith